Monastery of Saint-Paul de Mausole is a former monastery in Saint-Rémy-de-Provence, Provence, France. Several rooms of the building have been converted into a museum to Vincent van Gogh, who stayed there in 1889–1890 at a time when the monastery had been converted to an asylum.

History
The monastery was built in the 11th century. Franciscan monks established a psychiatric asylum there in 1605.

Van Gogh

In the aftermath of the 23 December 1888 breakdown that resulted in the self-mutilation of his left ear, Vincent van Gogh voluntarily admitted himself to the Saint-Paul-de-Mausole lunatic asylum on 8 May 1889. Housed in a former monastery, Saint-Paul-de-Mausole catered to the wealthy and was less than half full when Van Gogh arrived, allowing him to occupy not only a second-story bedroom but also a ground-floor room for use as a painting studio.

See also
 Théophile Peyron

References
Citations

Sources

 

Monuments historiques of Bouches-du-Rhône
Vincent van Gogh
Historic house museums in Provence-Alpes-Côte d'Azur
Saint-Rémy-de-Provence